MEF, founded in 2001, is a nonprofit international industry consortium, of network, cloud, and technology providers.  MEF, originally known as the Metro Ethernet Forum, was dedicated to Carrier Ethernet networks and services, and in recent years, significantly broadened its scope, which now includes underlay connectivity services such as Optical, Carrier Ethernet, IP, along with overlay digital services including SD-WAN Services, as well as APIs to support orchestration of the service lifecycle (termed Lifecycle Service Orchestration, or LSO APIs based on MEF 55 Lifecycle Service Orchestration (LSO): Reference Architecture and Framework, for connectivity and digital services). Along with this change in scope, MEF re-branded from the "Metro Ethernet Forum", to simply "MEF". "MEF Forum" is MEF's legal name.

The forum is composed of service providers, incumbent local exchange carriers, network equipment vendors, cloud providers and other related organizations, within the information and communications technology industry, that share an interest in connectivity services, digital services, automation, orchestration and standardization to pragmatically enhance and accelerate the industry's digital transformation. There are approximately 200 MEF members, many of which have achieved MEF 3.0 certification of their MEF-standardized services or technology.

MEF comprises multiple technical committees to develop, evolve and promote the adoption of MEF standard services and interfaces. This contrasts with standard bodies such as the Internet Engineering Task Force and the Institute of Electrical and Electronics Engineers (IEEE). The forum regularly makes recommendations to, and collaborates with, existing standards bodies and develops standards predominantly outside the scope of other standards bodies.

History

MEF was preceded by the Ethernet in the First Mile Alliance (EFMA), also a nonprofit international industry consortium, which was established in 2001 to promote standards-based Ethernet in the First Mile (EFM) technologies and products and position EFM as a networking technology for an access network.

In 2005, with the completion of the 802.3ah standard by the IEEE, the EFMA became part of MEF.

In 2015, MEF voted to change its name to "MEF Forum" to reflect its expansion in setting standards for network virtualization.

In 2017, the International Multimedia Telecommunications Consortium (IMTC) was merged into MEF.

In 2018, MEF published its first technical standards on optical transport (MEF 63) and IP (MEF 61).

MEF white papers

These white papers provide a comprehensive technical overview of MEF services, APIs, certification and new areas of work with MEF, based on the work of MEF's technical committees.

Technical specifications
As of October 2020, MEF had approved and published 80 technical standards, including amendments, excluding superseded standards:

 MEF 2    Requirements and Framework for Ethernet Service Protection
 MEF 3    Circuit Emulation Service Definitions, Framework and Requirements in Metro Ethernet Networks
 MEF 4    Metro Ethernet Network Architecture Framework Part 1: Generic Framework
 MEF 6.2    EVC Ethernet Services Definitions Phase 3 (supersedes MEF 6.1)
 MEF 7.2    Carrier Ethernet Information Model (supersedes MEF 7.1 and MEF 7.1.1)
 MEF 8    Implementation Agreement for the Emulation of PDH Circuits over Metro Ethernet Networks
 MEF 9    Abstract Test Suite for Ethernet Services at the UNI
 MEF 10.3    Ethernet Services Attributes Phase 3 (supersedes MEF 10, MEF 10.1, MEF 10.1.1, MEF 10.2 and MEF 10.2.1)
 MEF 10.3.1    Composite Performance Metric (CPM) Amendment to MEF 10.3
 MEF 11    User Network Interface (UNI) Requirements and Framework
 MEF 12.1    Carrier Ethernet Network Architecture Framework Part 2: Ethernet Services Layer (supersedes MEF 12.1 and MEF 12.1.1)
 MEF 13  User Network Interface (UNI) Type 1 Implementation Agreement
 MEF 14  Abstract Test Suite for Traffic Management Phase 1
 MEF 15  Requirements for Management of Metro Ethernet Phase 1 Network Elements
 MEF 16  Ethernet Local Management Interface
 MEF 17  Service OAM Framework and Requirements
 MEF 18  Abstract Test Suite for Circuit Emulation Services
 MEF 19  Abstract Test Suite for UNI Type 1
 MEF 20  UNI Type 2 Implementation Agreement
 MEF 21  Abstract Test Suite for UNI Type 2 Part 1 Link OAM 
 MEF 22.1  Mobile Backhaul Phase 2 Implementation Agreement (supersedes MEF 22)
 MEF 22.1.1  Amendment to MEF 22.1 – Small Cell Backhaul
 MEF 23.1  Class of Service Phase 2 Implementation Agreement (supersedes MEF 23)
 MEF 24  Abstract Test Suite for UNI Type 2 Part 2 E-LMI
 MEF 25  Abstract Test Suite for UNI Type 2 Part 3 Service OAM
 MEF 26.1  External Network Network Interface (ENNI)–Phase 2 (supersedes MEF 26, MEF 26.0.1, MEF 26.0.2 and MEF 26.0.3)
 MEF 27  Abstract Test Suite For UNI Type 2 Part 5: Enhanced UNI Attributes & Part 6: L2CP Handling
 MEF 28  External Network Network Interface (ENNI) Support for UNI Tunnel Access and Virtual UNI
 MEF 29  Ethernet Services Constructs
 MEF 30.1  Service OAM Fault Management Implementation Agreement Phase 2 (supersedes MEF 30)
 MEF 30.1.1  Amendment to SOAM FM IA
 MEF 31  Service OAM Fault Management Definition of Managed Objects 
 MEF 32  Requirements for Service Protection Across External Interfaces
 MEF 33  Ethernet Access Services Definition
 MEF 34  ATS for Ethernet Access Services
 MEF 35  Service OAM Performance Monitoring Implementation Agreement (supersedes MEF 35)
 MEF 36.1  Service OAM SNMP MIB for Performance Monitoring (supersedes MEF 36)
 MEF 37  Abstract Test Suite for ENNI
 MEF 38  Service OAM Fault Management YANG Modules
 MEF 39  SOAM Performance Monitoring YANG Module
 MEF 40  UNI and EVC Definition of Managed Objects (SNMP)
 MEF 41  Generic Token Bucket Algorithm
 MEF 42  ENNI and OVC Definition of Managed Objects (SNMP)
 MEF 43  Virtual NID (vNID) Functionality for E-Access Services
 MEF 44  Virtual NID (vNID) Definition of Managed Objects (SNMP)
 MEF 45  Multi-CEN L2CP
 MEF 46  Latching Loopback Protocol and Functionality
 MEF 47  Carrier Ethernet Services for Cloud implementation Agreement
 MEF 48  Service Activation Testing
 MEF 49  Service Activation Testing Control Protocol and PDU Formats
 MEF 49.0.1  Amendment to Service Activation Testing Control Protocol and PDU Formats
 MEF 50  Service Operations Guidelines
 MEF 51  OVC Services Definitions

References

External links
 MEF
 Ethernet Academy

Technology consortia
Metropolitan area networks
Computer network organizations
Standards organizations in the United States
Ethernet